Woodbrook railway station, or Woodbrook Halt, was a station on the former Dublin and South Eastern Railway, and was located on the southern outskirts of Dublin, Ireland. Opened in 1910, the station closed in 1960.  The halt served Shankill and Shanganagh, including the Woodbrook Estate from which it took its name, and lay a short distance north of Bray (at the northern edge of County Wicklow).

As of 2020, a new station, provisionally named Woodbrook DART Station (Irish: Stáisiún DART Shruthán na Coille), was proposed to be built on the DART in the nearby Shanganagh area of Dublin.

History
Woodbrook Halt was opened as a halt in 1910. The small station was located on the main line, a few yards south of Shanganagh Junction, thus receiving trains from both the main line and the Harcourt Street line.  It served Sir Stanley Cochrane's Woodbrook estate, and especially his cricket ground. The Woodbrook Golf Club and Cricket Grounds later used this halt, from 1920 to 1960.

The part of the line between Killiney and Bray was moved inland in 1915 due to coastal erosion, with Shanganagh Junction and the Woodbrook station being relocated as a result. The new station lay in what is now the centre of Shanganagh Park.

Closure
The Harcourt Street line had declined in use throughout the early 20th century and was closed by CIÉ at the end of 1958. Being on the main line, Woodbrook survived the closure of the branch for a year until January 1960, when lifting of the line began. In the years that followed, the building at the halt was demolished and as the years went on, the platforms became overgrown.

Proposed station
A new station is intended for an area zoned for future housing development, with access to the proposed station included as part of a list of strategic infrastructure projects financed under the Local Infrastructure Housing Activation Fund in 2017. The proposed station is close to (but unconnected to) the former Woodbrook halt, the remains of which remain along the line at Woodbrook Golf Club.

In August 2020, Iarnród Éireann stated its intention to apply for planning permission for the station. An application was submitted in October 2020, and planning permission was granted in July 2021.

References

Disused railway stations in County Dublin
Railway stations opened in 1910
Railway stations closed in 1960
1910 establishments in Ireland
Proposed railway stations in the Republic of Ireland
Railway stations in the Republic of Ireland opened in the 20th century